Zur Sache, Macho! is an Austrian-German film directed by Michael Rowitz. It was released in 2013.

Cast
Maximilian von Pufendorf  as Georg Sommer/Waltraud Winter 
Mirjam Weichselbraun as Lisa Rammser  
Matthias Buss as Micha Sommer  
Tino Mewes as Daniel Spatz  
Wolfgang Böck as Rudi Bauer  
Hilde Dalik as Magda Rammser  
Patricia Hirschbichler as Else Weigert  
Andrea Eckert as Katie Asbach  
Tim Breyvogel as Schneider  
Stefano Bernardin as Julius  
Elena Uhlig as Tiffy

References

External links
 

2013 television films
2013 films
Austrian television films
German television films
2010s German-language films
Sat.1 original programming